The Faculty of Mathematics, Physics and Informatics (FMPH; ; ; colloquial: Matfyz) is one of 13 faculties of the Comenius University in Bratislava, the capital of Slovakia. The faculty provides higher education in mathematics, physics and informatics, as well as teacher training in subjects related to these branches of study. It was established in 1980 by separating from the Faculty of Natural Sciences under the name of Faculty of Mathematics and Physics. Its name was changed to the contemporary name in 2000.

In 2015, Faculty of Mathematics, Physics and Informatics was ranked first in the group of natural sciences in the ranking of faculties in Slovakia by the Academic Ranking and Rating Agency (ARRA).

The campus is located in Mlynská dolina in Bratislava, along with the Faculty of Natural Sciences of the Comenius University, the Faculty of Informatics and Information Technologies and the Faculty of Electrical Engineering and Information Technology of the Slovak University of Technology.

Endowment of the faculty in 2015 was €11.7 million.

Departments

Mathematics 

 Department of Algebra, Geometry and Didactics of Mathematics
 Department of Applied Mathematics and Statistics
 Department of Mathematical Analysis and Numerical Mathematics

Physics 

 Department of Astronomy, Physics of the Earth and Meteorology
 Department of Experimental Physics
 Department of Nuclear Physics and Biophysics
 Department of Theoretical Physics and Didactics of Physics

Informatics 

 Department of Applied Informatics
 Department of Informatics
 Department of Informatics Education

Study programmes 

The faculty offers undergraduate and postgraduate education in the fields of mathematics, physics, informatics and teaching.

Mathematics

Undergraduate 

 Mathematics
 Economic and Financial Mathematics
 Managerial Mathematics
 Insurance Mathematics

Postgraduate 

 Computer Graphics and Geometry
 Economic and Financial Mathematics
 Mathematics
 Managerial Mathematics
 Probability and Mathematical Statistics

Physics

Undergraduate 

 Physics
 Renewable Energy Sources and Environmental Physics
 Biomedical Physics

Postgraduate 

 Astronomy and Astrophysics
 Biophysics and Chemical Physics
 Biomedical Physics
 Environmental Physics, Renewable Energy Sources, Meteorology and Climatology
 Nuclear and Sub-nuclear Physics
 Optics, Lasers and Optical Spectroscopy
 Physics of the Earth
 Plasma Physics
 Solid State Physics
 Theoretical Physics

Informatics

Undergraduate 

 Informatics
 Applied Informatics
 Bioinformatics
 Data science

Postgraduate 

 Informatics
 Applied Informatics
 Cognitive Science

Teacher training 

Teacher training forms a separate group of study. Physical education instruction is provided by the Faculty of Physical Education and Sports and English is provided by the Faculty of Arts. Special teacher training is also offered for those graduates of the faculty following a non-teaching course of study who are interested in gaining the Teacher Certificates for secondary schools.

Undergraduate 

 Teaching of descriptive geometry in combination with mathematics
 Teaching of informatics in combination with mathematics, physics and biology
 Teaching of mathematics in combination with physics, informatics, descriptive geometry and physical education
 Teaching of physics in combination with mathematics or informatics

Postgraduate 

 Teaching of descriptive geometry  in combination
 Teaching of informatics in combination
 Teaching of mathematics in combination
 Teaching of physics  in combination

Facilities 

 Faculty library (located in the pavilion of Mathematics)
 Astronomical Observatory of Modra

Student life

ŠKAS 
Student House of the Academic Senate of FMFI UK (ŠKAS) is an association representing students in the academic senate of the faculty. The student representatives are voted by students of the faculty in annual election.

ŠKAS organizes events such as Deposition, Christmas cabbage soup and punch, Ball of FMFI UK, Doors Open Day and Freshers' week. ŠKAS also maintains a student room Cauchy Clubroom, various free time facilities at the faculty and publishes an online guidebook for new students.

Publishing 

The faculty publishes open access academic journals:

 Acta Mathematica Universitatis Comenianae
 Acta Physica Universitatis Comenianae

Notable alumni and academic staff 

 Vladimír Černý – physicist, independently described simulated annealing in 1985
 Martin Mojžiš – popular Slovak theoretical physicist
 Martin Benko – director of the Slovak Hydrometeorological Institute

Gallery

References

External links 
 Official homepage
 YouTube channel

Comenius University
Education in Bratislava